Ghargad Fort  / Gadgada Fort is a fort located 145 km from Mumbai, in Nashik district, of Maharashtra. This fort is less visited fort in Nashik district. This fort is quiet difficult to climb.

History
Much less history about this fort is known. This fort surrendered to British immediately after the fall of the Trymbakgad.Captain Briggs captured this fort in 1818. This fort was under the control of British, till the Indian independence.

How to reach
The nearest town is Ghoti which is 129 km from Mumbai. The base village of the fort is Gadgad Sangvi which is 16 km from Ghoti. There are good hotels at Ghoti. The trekking path starts from the hillock north of the base village. The route is narrow and covered with bushes. There are no trees on the trekking route. It takes about an hour to reach the entrance gate of the fort.

Places to see
There are two gates on the main entrance path of the fort. There is a rock-cut water cistern and a cave on the fort. It takes about an hour to visit all places on the fort.

See also 
 List of forts in Maharashtra
 List of forts in India
 Marathi People
 Battles involving the Maratha Empire
 Maratha Army
 East India Company
 Military history of India
 List of people involved in the Maratha Empire

References 

Buildings and structures of the Maratha Empire
16th-century forts in India
Buildings and structures in Maharashtra